Robert Galsworthy (born ) is an Australian male weightlifter, competing in the 105 kg category and representing Australia at international competitions. He participated at the 2010 Commonwealth Games in the 105 kg event.

Major competitions

References

1989 births
Living people
Australian male weightlifters
Weightlifters at the 2010 Commonwealth Games
Commonwealth Games competitors for Australia
Place of birth missing (living people)
Weightlifters at the 2014 Commonwealth Games
20th-century Australian people
21st-century Australian people